Bastian Sick (born 17 July 1965) is a German journalist and author.

History 

Bastian Sick grew up in Ratekau, in the north of Germany near Lübeck. He attended the “Leibniz Gymnasium” in Bad Schwartau where he did his Abitur (A-level) in 1984. After his military service he studied history and Romance philology. He graduated Magister Artium. During his studies he worked as a corrector and translator for the Carlsen-Verlag (Carlsen-press). Sick explains in the foreword of the Carlsen anniversary issue “Spirou & Fantasio” that the work experience as a translator and corrector coined his sense for orthography and punctuation.
In 1995 Bastian Sick started working as a documentation journalist in the photo archive of German news magazine Der Spiegel. In 1999 he joined the editorial team of the magazine “Spiegel online” and became a literary editor. In 2003 he became famous as the author of the column “Zwiebelfisch”. In those columns he writes in a funny and entertaining way about the case of doubt in the German language, for example grammar, spelling, punctuation and style.

In 2004, 50 of these columns were published in print by Kiepenheuer & Witsch in Cologne. The title of the book called Der Dativ ist dem Genitiv sein Tod (literally The Dative is to the Genitive its Death) use puns employing the his genitive, which is not used in standard German and often considered unaesthetic, instead of the normative genitive case. More than 2 million copies of this book were sold within two years. Two sequels have been published within the same time period. The “Zwiebelfisch” was the first Internet column which became a bestseller after it was published as a book. Besides his columns Bastian Sick published other books about language curiosities. For instance “Happy Aua”, part 1-4. From the content of the book series “Der Dativ ist dem Genitiv sein Tod” board games, computer games and calendar were produced.

Sick has done several tours of reading where he also performed as an entertainer. On the 13 of March 2006, Bastian Sick performed in the Cologne Arena in front of an audience of 15.000 people in “the biggest German lesson of the world”. Therefore, he was supported by others such as Thomas Bug, Joachim Hermann Luger, Jürgen Rüttgers, Frank Plasberg, Frank Rost, Cordula Stratmann, and Annette Frier. Recordings from this event and recordings from his tours were published as audio books. Due to an invitation of the Sony-BMG in 2007, Bastian Sick published a CD called “Lieder voller Poesie”, a homage to the musician and singer Udo Jürgens.

In the year 2008 Sick hosted a temporary TV-Show on WDR. With artists like Jochen Busse, Konrad Beikircher and Susanne Pätzold Sick presented in his thirty minutes show oddities out of the language everyday life. In the following year Sick left the Spiegel publishing company and became a self-employed author and speaker. With his program “Nur aus Jux und Tolleranz” he went on tour through Germany in 2011 and 2013. Invited by the Goethe Institute, German schools and other educational establishments Sick did many performances in foreign countries, for example in Montréal (Canada), Hungary, Spain, Portugal, South Tyrol (Italy), Great Britain and Egypt. In addition he did a South-America tour with eight performances in six countries in 2008. Bastian Sick lives and works in Hamburg.

Works

Books
 Der Dativ ist dem Genitiv sein Tod. Ein Wegweiser durch den Irrgarten der deutschen Sprache. Kiepenheuer und Witsch, Köln 2004, .
 Der Dativ ist dem Genitiv sein Tod. Folge 2. Neues aus dem Irrgarten der deutschen Sprache. Kiepenheuer und Witsch, Köln 2005, .
 Der Dativ ist dem Genitiv sein Tod. Folge 3. Noch mehr Neues aus dem Irrgarten der deutschen Sprache. Kiepenheuer und Witsch, Köln 2006, .
 Der Dativ ist dem Genitiv sein Tod. Folge 4. Das Allerneueste aus dem Irrgarten der deutschen Sprache. Kiepenheuer und Witsch, Köln 2009, .
 Der Dativ ist dem Genitiv sein Tod. Folge 5. Kiepenheuer und Witsch, Köln 2013, .
 Der Dativ ist dem Genitiv sein Tod. Folge 6. Kiepenheuer und Witsch, Köln 2015, .
 Füllen Sie sich wie zu Hause. Ein Bilderbuch aus dem Irrgarten der deutschen Sprache. Kiepenheuer und Witsch, Köln 2014, .
 Happy Aua. Ein Bilderbuch aus dem Irrgarten der deutschen Sprache. Kiepenheuer und Witsch, Köln 2007, .
 Happy Aua 2. Ein Bilderbuch aus dem Irrgarten der deutschen Sprache. Kiepenheuer und Witsch, Köln 2008, .
 Hier ist Spaß gratiniert. Ein Bilderbuch aus dem Irrgarten der deutschen Sprache. Kiepenheuer und Witsch, Köln 2010, .
 Wegweiser durch den Irrgarten der deutschen Sprache. Kiepenheuer und Witsch, Köln 2012, .
 Wie gut ist Ihr Deutsch? Der große Test. Kiepenheuer und Witsch, Köln 2011, .
 Wie gut ist ihr Deutsch? 2. Der neue große Test Kiepenheuer und Witsch, Köln 2019, .
 Wie gut ist Ihr Deutsch? 3 Dem großen Test sein dritter Teil. Kiepenheuer und Witsch, Köln 2021, .
 Wir braten Sie gern! Ein Bilderbuch aus dem Irrgarten der deutschen Sprache. Kiepenheuer und Witsch, Köln 2013, .
 Wir sind Urlaub! Das Happy-Aua-Postkartenbuch. Kiepenheuer und Witsch, Köln 2010, .

CDs
Der Dativ ist dem Genitiv sein Tod. Read by Rudolf Kowalski, Der Audio Verlag (DAV), Berlin, 2005,  (Lesung, 2 CDs, 153 Min.)
Der Dativ ist dem Genitiv sein Tod, Folge 2. Read by Bastian Sick, Der Audio Verlag (DAV), Berlin, 2005,  (Lesung, 2 CDs, 151 Min.)
Der Dativ ist dem Genitiv sein Tod, Folge 3. Read by Bastian Sick, Der Audio Verlag (DAV), Berlin, 2006,  (Lesung, 2 CDs, 146 Min.)
Bastian Sick Live. Der Audio Verlag (DAV), Berlin, 2007,  (Live-Show, 1 CD, 76 Min.)
"Happy Aua" - Tour 2008. Der Audio Verlag (DAV), Berlin, 2008,  (Live-Show, 1 CD, 73 Min.)
Der Dativ ist dem Genitiv sein Tod, Folge 4. Read by Bastian Sick, Der Audio Verlag (DAV), Berlin, 2009,  (Lesung, 2 CDs, 159 Min.)
Der Dativ ist dem Genitiv sein Tod, Folge 5. Read by Bastian Sick, Der Audio Verlag (DAV), Berlin, 2012,  (Lesung, 2 CDs, 168 Min.)

Singles 
Keine andere Sprache.  2014. Music and lyrics: Bastian Sick. ASIN: B00K6I4KXY
Würde Goethe heut noch leben.  2014. Music and lyrics: Bastian Sick. ASIN: B00K6I6WIA

References

External links
 'Zwiebelfisch' - A regular series of articles written by Sick on Spiegel Online

1965 births
German LGBT journalists
German male journalists
Living people
Writers from Lübeck
German LGBT writers
20th-century German male writers
21st-century German male writers
Der Spiegel people
21st-century German LGBT people